The Monk Who Transformed Uttar Pradesh is a 2021 book written by Shantanu Gupta and published by Garuda Prakashan. The book is about the “transformation” of north-Indian state, Uttar Pradesh, under the chief-ministership of Yogi Adityanath.

References 

2021 non-fiction books
21st-century Indian books